

Events

Pre-1600
AD 64 – The Great Fire of Rome causes widespread devastation and rages on for six days, destroying half of the city.
 484 – Leontius, Roman usurper, is crowned Eastern emperor at Tarsus (modern Turkey). He is recognized in Antioch and makes it his capital.
711 – Umayyad conquest of Hispania: Battle of Guadalete: Umayyad forces under Tariq ibn Ziyad defeat the Visigoths led by King Roderic.
 939 – Battle of Simancas: King Ramiro II of León defeats the Moorish army under Caliph Abd-al-Rahman III near the city of Simancas.
 998 – Arab–Byzantine wars: Battle of Apamea: Fatimids defeat a Byzantine army near Apamea.
1333 – Wars of Scottish Independence: Battle of Halidon Hill: The English win a decisive victory over the Scots.
1544 – Italian War of 1542–46: The first Siege of Boulogne begins.
1545 – The Tudor warship Mary Rose sinks off Portsmouth; in 1982 the wreck is salvaged in one of the most complex and expensive projects in the history of maritime archaeology.
1553 – The attempt to install Lady Jane Grey as Queen of England   collapses after only nine days.
1588 – Anglo-Spanish War: Battle of Gravelines: The Spanish Armada is sighted in the English Channel.

1601–1900
1701 – Representatives of the Iroquois Confederacy sign the Nanfan Treaty, ceding a large territory north of the Ohio River to England.
1702 – Great Northern War: A numerically superior Polish-Saxon army of Augustus II the Strong, operating from an advantageous defensive position, is defeated by a Swedish army half its size under the command of King Charles XII in the Battle of Klissow.
1817 – Unsuccessful in his attempt to conquer the Kingdom of Hawaii for the Russian-American Company, Georg Anton Schäffer is forced to admit defeat and leave Kauai.
1821 – Coronation of George IV of the United Kingdom.
1832 – The British Medical Association is founded as the Provincial Medical and Surgical Association by Sir Charles Hastings at a meeting in the Board Room of the Worcester Infirmary.
1845 – Great New York City Fire of 1845: The last great fire to affect Manhattan begins early in the morning and is subdued that afternoon. The fire kills four firefighters and 26 civilians and destroys 345 buildings.
1848 – Women's rights: A two-day Women's Rights Convention opens in Seneca Falls, New York.
1863 – American Civil War: Morgan's Raid: At Buffington Island in Ohio, Confederate General John Hunt Morgan's raid into the north is mostly thwarted when a large group of his men are captured while trying to escape across the Ohio River.
1864 – Taiping Rebellion: Third Battle of Nanking: The Qing dynasty finally defeats the Taiping Heavenly Kingdom.
1870 – Franco-Prussian War: France declares war on Prussia.
1900 – The first line of the Paris Métro opens for operation.

1901–present
1903 – Maurice Garin wins the first Tour de France.
1916 – World War I: Battle of Fromelles: British and Australian troops attack German trenches as part of the Battle of the Somme.
1936 – Spanish Civil War: The CNT and UGT call a general strike in Spain – mobilizing workers' militias against the Nationalist forces.
1940 – World War II: Battle of Cape Spada: The Royal Navy and the Regia Marina clash; the Italian light cruiser Bartolomeo Colleoni sinks, with 121 casualties.
  1940   – Field Marshal Ceremony: First occasion in World War II that Adolf Hitler appoints field marshals due to military achievements.
  1940   – World War II: Army order 112 forms the Intelligence Corps of the British Army.
1942 – World War II: The Second Happy Time of Hitler's submarines comes to an end, as the increasingly effective American convoy system compels them to return to the central Atlantic.
1943 – World War II: Rome is heavily bombed by more than 500 Allied aircraft, inflicting thousands of casualties.
1947 – Prime Minister of the shadow Burmese government, Bogyoke Aung San and eight others are assassinated.
  1947   – Korean politician Lyuh Woon-hyung is assassinated.
1952 – Opening of the Summer Olympics in Helsinki, Finland.
1957 – The largely autobiographical novel The Ordeal of Gilbert Pinfold by Evelyn Waugh was published.
1961 – Tunisia imposes a blockade on the French naval base at Bizerte; the French would capture the entire town four days later.
1963 – Joe Walker flies a North American X-15 to a record altitude of 106,010 meters (347,800 feet) on X-15 Flight 90. Exceeding an altitude of 100 km, this flight qualifies as a human spaceflight under international convention.
1964 – Vietnam War: At a rally in Saigon, South Vietnamese Prime Minister Nguyễn Khánh calls for expanding the war into North Vietnam.
1967 – Piedmont Airlines Flight 22, a Piedmont Airlines Boeing 727-22 and a twin-engine Cessna 310 collided over Hendersonville, North Carolina, USA. Both aircraft were destroyed and all passengers and crew were killed, including John T. McNaughton, an advisor to Robert McNamara.
1969 – Chappaquiddick incident: U.S. Senator Ted Kennedy crashes his car into a tidal pond at Chappaquiddick Island, Massachusetts, killing his passenger Mary Jo Kopechne.
1972 – Dhofar Rebellion: British SAS units help the Omani government against Popular Front for the Liberation of Oman rebels in the Battle of Mirbat.
1976 – Sagarmatha National Park in Nepal is created.
1977 – The world's first Global Positioning System (GPS) signal was transmitted from Navigation Technology Satellite 2 (NTS-2) and received at Rockwell Collins in Cedar Rapids, Iowa, at 12:41 a.m. Eastern time (ET).
1979 – The Sandinista rebels overthrow the government of the Somoza family in Nicaragua.
  1979   – The oil tanker SS Atlantic Empress collides with another oil tanker, causing the largest ever ship-borne oil spill. 
1980 – Opening of the Summer Olympics in Moscow.
1981 – In a private meeting with U.S. President Ronald Reagan, French President François Mitterrand reveals the existence of the Farewell Dossier, a collection of documents showing the Soviet Union had been stealing American technological research and development.
1982 – In one of the first militant attacks by Hezbollah, David S. Dodge, president of the American University of Beirut, is kidnapped.
1983 – The first three-dimensional reconstruction of a human head in a CT is published.
1985 – The Val di Stava dam collapses killing 268 people in Val di Stava, Italy.
1989 – United Airlines Flight 232 crashes in Sioux City, Iowa killing 111.
1992 – A car bomb kills Judge Paolo Borsellino and five members of his escort.
1997 – The Troubles: The Provisional Irish Republican Army resumes a ceasefire to end their 25-year paramilitary campaign to end British rule in Northern Ireland.
2011 – Guinean President Alpha Condé survives an attempted assassination and coup d'état at his residence in Conakry.
2012 – Syrian civil war: The People's Protection Units (YPG) capture the city of Kobanî without resistance, starting the Rojava conflict in Northeast Syria.
2014 – Gunmen in Egypt's western desert province of New Valley Governorate attack a military checkpoint, killing at least 21 soldiers. Egypt reportedly declares a state of emergency on its border with Sudan.
2018 – The Knesset passes the controversial Nationality Bill, which defines the State of Israel as the nation-state of the Jewish people.

Births

Pre-1600
 810 – Muhammad al-Bukhari, Persian scholar (d. 870)
1223 – Baibars, sultan of Egypt (d. 1277)
1420 – William VIII, Marquess of Montferrat (d. 1483)
1569 – Conrad Vorstius, Dutch theologian (d. 1622)

1601–1900
1670 – Richard Leveridge, English singer-songwriter (d. 1758)
1688 – Giuseppe Castiglione, Italian missionary and painter (d. 1766)
1744 – Heinrich Christian Boie, German author and poet (d. 1806)
1759 – Marianna Auenbrugger, Austrian pianist and composer (d. 1782)
  1759   – Seraphim of Sarov, Russian monk and saint (d. 1833)
1771 – Thomas Talbot, Irish-Canadian colonel and politician (d. 1853)
1794 – José Justo Corro, Mexican politician and president (d. 1864)
1789 – John Martin, English painter, engraver, and illustrator (d. 1854)
1800 – Juan José Flores, Venezuelan general and politician, 1st President of Ecuador (d. 1864)
1814 – Samuel Colt, American businessman, founded the Colt's Manufacturing Company (d. 1862)
1819 – Gottfried Keller, Swiss author, poet, and playwright (d. 1890)
1822 – Princess Augusta of Cambridge (d. 1916)
1827 – Mangal Pandey, Indian soldier (d. 1857)
1834 – Edgar Degas, French painter, sculptor, and illustrator (d. 1917)
1835 – Justo Rufino Barrios, Guatemalan president (d. 1885)
1842 – Frederic T. Greenhalge, English-American lawyer and politician, 38th Governor of Massachusetts (d. 1896)
1846 – Edward Charles Pickering, American astronomer and physicist (d. 1919)
1849 – Ferdinand Brunetière, French scholar and critic (d. 1906)
1860 – Lizzie Borden, American woman, tried and acquitted for the murders of her father and step-mother in 1892 (d. 1927)
1864 – Fiammetta Wilson, English astronomer (d. 1920)
1865 – Georges Friedel, French mineralogist and crystallographer (d. 1933)
  1865   – Charles Horace Mayo, American surgeon, co-founder of the Mayo Clinic (d. 1939)
1868 – Florence Foster Jenkins, American soprano and educator (d. 1944)
1869 – Xenophon Stratigos, Greek general and politician, Greek Minister of Transport (d. 1927)
1875 – Alice Dunbar Nelson, American poet and activist (d. 1935)
1876 – Joseph Fielding Smith, American religious leader, 10th President of The Church of Jesus Christ of Latter-day Saints (d. 1972)
1877 – Arthur Fielder, English cricketer (d. 1949)
1881 – Friedrich Dessauer, German physicist and philosopher (d. 1963)
1883 – Max Fleischer, Austrian-American animator and producer (d. 1972)
1886 – Michael Fekete, Hungarian-Israeli mathematician and academic (d. 1957)
1888 – Enno Lolling, German physician (d. 1945)
1890 – George II of Greece (d. 1947)
1892 – Dick Irvin, Canadian ice hockey player and coach (d. 1957)
1893 – Vladimir Mayakovsky, Russian actor, playwright, and poet (d. 1930)
1894 – Aleksandr Khinchin, Russian mathematician and academic (d. 1959)
  1894   – Khawaja Nazimuddin, Bangladeshi-Pakistani politician, 2nd Prime Minister of Pakistan (d. 1965)
  1894   – Percy Spencer, American physicist and inventor of the microwave oven (d. 1969)
1895 – Xu Beihong, Chinese painter and academic (d. 1953)
1896 – Reginald Baker, English film producer (d. 1985)
  1896   – A. J. Cronin, Scottish physician and novelist (d. 1981)
  1896   – Bob Meusel, American baseball player and sailor (d. 1977)
1898 – Herbert Marcuse, German-American sociologist and philosopher (d. 1979)
1899 – Balai Chand Mukhopadhyay, Indian physician, author, poet, and playwright (d. 1979)

1901–present
1902 – Samudrala Sr., Indian singer, director, producer, and screenwriter (d. 1968)
1904 – Robert Todd Lincoln Beckwith, American lawyer and farmer (d. 1985)
1907 – Isabel Jewell, American actress (d. 1972)
1908 – Daniel Fry, American contactee (d. 1992)
1909 – Balamani Amma, Indian poet and author (d. 2004)
1912 – Peter Leo Gerety, American prelate (d. 2016)
1913 – Kay Linaker, American actress and screenwriter (d. 2008)
1914 – Marius Russo, American baseball player (d. 2005)
1915 – Åke Hellman, Finnish painter (d. 2017)
1916 – Phil Cavarretta, American baseball player and manager (d. 2010)
1917 – William Scranton, American captain and politician, 13th United States Ambassador to the United Nations (d. 2013)
1919 – Patricia Medina, English-American actress (d. 2012)
  1919   – Miltos Sachtouris, Greek poet and author (d. 2005)
  1919   – Ron Searle, English-Canadian soldier, publisher, and politician, 4th Mayor of Mississauga (d. 2015)
1920 – Robert Mann, American violinist, composer, and conductor (d. 2018)
  1920   – Richard Oriani, Salvadoran-American metallurgist and engineer (d. 2015)
1921 – Harold Camping, American evangelist, author, radio host (d. 2013)
  1921   – André Moynet, French soldier, race car driver, and politician (d. 1993)
  1921   – Elizabeth Spencer, American novelist, short story writer, and playwright (d. 2019)
  1921   – Rosalyn Sussman Yalow, American physicist and academic, Nobel Prize laureate (d. 2011)
1922 – George McGovern, American lieutenant, historian, and politician (d. 2012)
  1922   – Rachel Robinson, American professor, registered nurse, and the widow of baseball player Jackie Robinson
1923 – Theo Barker, English historian (d. 2001)
  1923   – Alex Hannum, American basketball player and coach (d. 2002)
  1923   – Joseph Hansen, American author and poet (d. 2004)
  1923   – William A. Rusher, American lawyer and journalist (d. 2011)
  1923   – Lon Simmons, American baseball player and sportscaster (d. 2015)
1924 – Stanley K. Hathaway, American soldier, lawyer, and politician, 40th United States Secretary of the Interior (d. 2005)
  1924   – Pat Hingle, American actor and producer (d. 2009)
  1924   – Arthur Rankin Jr., American director, producer, and screenwriter (d. 2014)
1925 – Sue Thompson, American singer (d. 2021)
1926 – Helen Gallagher, American actress, singer, and dancer
1928 – Samuel John Hazo, American author
  1928   – Choi Yun-chil, South Korean long-distance runner and a two-time national champion in the marathon (d. 2020)
1929 – Gaston Glock, Austrian engineer and businessman, co-founded Glock Ges.m.b.H.
  1929   – Orville Turnquest, Bahamian politician
1932 – Buster Benton, American singer-songwriter and guitarist (d. 1996)
  1932   – Jan Lindblad, Swedish biologist and photographer (d. 1987)
1934 – Francisco de Sá Carneiro, Portuguese lawyer and politician, 111th Prime Minister of Portugal (d. 1980)
1935 – Nick Koback, American baseball player and golfer (d. 2015)
1936 – David Colquhoun, English pharmacologist and academic
1937 – George Hamilton IV, American singer-songwriter and guitarist (d. 2014)
1938 – Richard Jordan, American actor (d. 1993)
  1938   – Jayant Narlikar, Indian astrophysicist and astronomer
  1938   – Tom Raworth, English poet and academic (d. 2017)
1941 – Vikki Carr, American singer and actress
  1941   – Neelie Kroes, Dutch politician and diplomat, European Commissioner for Digital Economy and Society
1943 – Han Sai Por, Singaporean sculptor and academic
  1943   – Carla Mazzuca Poggiolini, Italian journalist and politician
1944 – George Frayne, American musician a.k.a. Commander Cody (d. 2021)
  1944   – Tim McIntire, American actor and singer (d. 1986)
  1944   – Andres Vooremaa, Estonian chess player 
1945 – Paule Baillargeon, Canadian actress, director, and screenwriter
1946 – Alan Gorrie, Scottish singer-songwriter and musician
  1946   – Ilie Năstase, Romanian tennis player and politician
1947 – André Forcier, Canadian director and screenwriter
  1947   – Hans-Jürgen Kreische, German footballer and manager
  1947   – Bernie Leadon, American guitarist and songwriter
  1947   – Brian May, English singer-songwriter, guitarist, producer, and astrophysicist 
1948 – Keith Godchaux, American keyboard player and songwriter (d. 1980)
1949 – Kgalema Motlanthe, South African politician, 3rd President of South Africa
1950 – Per-Kristian Foss, Norwegian politician, Norwegian Minister of Finance
  1950   – Freddy Moore, American singer-songwriter and guitarist 
  1950   – Adrian Noble, English director and screenwriter
1951 – Abel Ferrara, American director, producer, and screenwriter
1952 – Allen Collins, American guitarist and songwriter (d. 1990)
  1952   – Jayne Anne Phillips American novelist and short story writer
1954 – Mark O'Donnell, American playwright (d. 2012)
  1954   – Steve O'Donnell, American screenwriter and producer
  1954   – Srđa Trifković, Serbian-American journalist and historian
1955 – Roger Binny, Indian cricketer and sportscaster
  1955   – Dalton McGuinty, Canadian lawyer and politician, 24th Premier of Ontario
  1956   – Mark Crispin, American computer scientist, designed the IMAP (d. 2012)
1958 – Brad Drewett, Australian tennis player and sportscaster (d. 2013)
  1958   – Robert Gibson, American wrestler
  1958   – David Robertson, American conductor
1959 – Juan J. Campanella, Argentinian director, producer, and screenwriter
1960 – Atom Egoyan, Egyptian-Canadian director, producer, and screenwriter
  1960   – Kevin Haskins, English drummer and songwriter 
1961 – Harsha Bhogle, Indian journalist and author
  1961   – Maria Filatova, Russian gymnast
  1961   – Lisa Lampanelli, American comedian, actress, and author
  1961   – Benoît Mariage, Belgian director and screenwriter
  1961   – Hideo Nakata, Japanese director, producer, and screenwriter
  1961   – Campbell Scott, American actor, director, and producer
1962 – Anthony Edwards, American actor and director
1963 – Thomas Gabriel Fischer, Swiss musician
  1963   – Garth Nix, Australian author
1964 – Teresa Edwards, American basketball player
  1964   – Masahiko Kondō, Japanese singer-songwriter and race car driver
1965 – Evelyn Glennie, Scottish musician
  1965   – Claus-Dieter Wollitz, German footballer and manager
1967 – Yael Abecassis, Israeli model and actress
  1967   – Jean-François Mercier, Canadian comedian, screenwriter, and television host
1968 – Robb Flynn, American singer-songwriter, guitarist, and producer 
  1968   – Pavel Kuka, Czech footballer and manager
  1968   – Jim Norton, American comedian, actor, and author
1969 – Matthew Libatique, American cinematographer
1970 – Bill Chen, American poker player and software designer
  1970   – Nicola Sturgeon, Scottish lawyer and politician, First Minister of Scotland
1971 – Rene Busch, Estonian tennis player and coach
  1971   – Vitali Klitschko, Ukrainian boxer and politician, Mayor of Kyiv
  1971   – Michael Modest, American wrestler
  1971   – Catriona Rowntree, Australian television host
  1971   – Lesroy Weekes, Montserratian cricketer
1972 – Ebbe Sand, Danish footballer and manager
1973 – Martin Powell, English keyboard player and songwriter 
  1973   – Scott Walker, Canadian ice hockey player and coach
1974 – Rey Bucanero, Mexican wrestler
  1974   – Francisco Copado, German footballer and manager
  1974   – Josée Piché, Canadian ice dancer
  1974   – Vince Spadea, American tennis player
  1974   – Preston Wilson, American baseball player and sportscaster
1975 – Luca Castellazzi, Italian footballer
1976 – Benedict Cumberbatch, English actor
  1976   – Gonzalo de los Santos, Uruguayan footballer and manager
1977 – Jean-Sébastien Aubin, Canadian ice hockey player
  1977   – Tony Mamaluke, American wrestler and manager
  1977   – Ed Smith, English cricketer and journalist
1979 – Rick Ankiel, American baseball player
  1979   – Josué Anunciado de Oliveira, Brazilian footballer
  1979   – Dilhara Fernando, Sri Lankan cricketer
  1979   – Luke Young, English footballer
1980 – Xavier Malisse, Belgian tennis player
  1980   – Giorgio Mondini, Italian race car driver
1981 – Nenê, Brazilian footballer
  1981   – David Bernard, Jamaican cricketer
  1981   – Mark Gasnier, Australian rugby player and sportscaster
  1981   – Jimmy Gobble, American baseball player
  1981   – Grégory Vignal, French footballer
1982 – Christopher Bear, American drummer 
  1982   – Phil Coke, American baseball player
  1982   – Jared Padalecki, American actor
  1982   – Jess Vanstrattan, Australian footballer
1983 – Helen Skelton, English television host and actress
  1983   – Fedor Tyutin, Russian ice hockey player
1984 – Andrea Libman, Canadian voice actress
  1984   – Adam Morrison, American basketball player
  1984   – Ryan O'Byrne, Canadian ice hockey player
  1984   – Lewis Price, Welsh footballer
1985 – LaMarcus Aldridge, American basketball player
  1985   – Zhou Haibin, Chinese footballer
  1985   – Marina Kuzina, Russian basketball player
  1985   – Hadi Norouzi, Iranian footballer (d. 2015)
1986 – Leandro Greco, Italian footballer
1987 – Jon Jones, American mixed martial artist
  1987   – Marc Murphy, Australian footballer
1988 – Shane Dawson, American comedian and actor
  1988   – Kevin Großkreutz, German footballer
  1988   – Jakub Kovář, Czech ice hockey player
1989 – Sam McKendry, Australian-New Zealand rugby league player
1991 – Eray İşcan, Turkish footballer
1992 – Jake Nicholson, English footballer
1994 – Christian Welch, Australian rugby league player
1996 – Paul Momirovski, Australian rugby league player
1998 – Erin Cuthbert, footballer
  1998   – Ronaldo Vieira, Bissau-Guinean footballer
2003 – Tyler Downs, American Olympic diver

Deaths

Pre-1600
 514 – Symmachus, pope of the Catholic Church
 806 – Li Shigu, Chinese general (b. 778)
 973 – Kyunyeo, Korean monk and poet (b. 917)
 998 – Damian Dalassenos, Byzantine general (b. 940)
1030 – Adalberon, French bishop
1234 – Floris IV, Dutch nobleman (b. 1210)
1249 – Jacopo Tiepolo, doge of Venice
1333 – John Campbell, Scottish nobleman
  1333   – Alexander Bruce, Scottish nobleman
  1333   – Sir Archibald Douglas, Scottish nobleman
  1333   – Maol Choluim II, Scottish nobleman
  1333   – Kenneth de Moravia, 4th Earl of Sutherland
1374 – Petrarch, Italian poet and scholar (b. 1304)
1415 – Philippa of Lancaster, Portuguese queen (b. 1360)
1543 – Mary Boleyn, English daughter of Elizabeth Boleyn, Countess of Wiltshire (b. 1499)

1601–1900
1631 – Cesare Cremonini, Italian philosopher and academic (b. 1550)
1742 – William Somervile, English poet and author (b. 1675)
1810 – Louise of Mecklenburg-Strelitz, Prussian queen (b. 1776)
1814 – Matthew Flinders, English navigator and cartographer (b. 1774)
1824 – Agustín de Iturbide, Mexican general and emperor (b. 1783)
1838 – Pierre Louis Dulong, French physicist and chemist (b. 1785)
1850 – Margaret Fuller, American journalist and critic (b. 1810)
1855 – Konstantin Batyushkov, Russian poet and translator (b. 1787)
1857 – Stefano Franscini, Swiss statistician and politician (b. 1796)
1878 – Yegor Ivanovich Zolotarev, Russian mathematician and academic (b. 1847)
1882 – John William Bean, English criminal and failed regicide (b. 1824)
1896 – Abraham H. Cannon, American publisher and religious leader (b. 1859)

1901–present
1913 – Clímaco Calderón, Colombian lawyer and politician, 15th President of Colombia (b. 1852)
1925 – John Indermaur, British lawyer (b. 1851)
1930 – Robert Stout, Scottish-New Zealand politician, 13th Prime Minister of New Zealand (b. 1844)
1933 – Kaarle Krohn, Finnish historian and academic (b. 1863)
1939 – Rose Hartwick Thorpe, American poet and author (b. 1850)
1943 – Yekaterina Budanova, Russian captain and pilot (b. 1916)
1947 – U Razak, Burmese educator and politician (b. 1898)
  1947   – Aung San, Burmese general and politician (b. 1915)
  1947   – Lyuh Woon-hyung, South Korean politician (b. 1886)
1963 – William Andrew, English priest (b. 1884)
1965 – Syngman Rhee, South Korean journalist and politician, 1st President of South Korea (b. 1875)
1967 – John T. McNaughton, United States Assistant Secretary of Defense for International Security Affairs and an advisor to Robert McNamara (b. 1921) 
  1967   – Odell Shepard, American poet and politician, 66th Lieutenant Governor of Connecticut (b. 1884)
1969 – Stratis Myrivilis, Greek soldier and author (b. 1890)
1974 – Ernő Schwarz, Hungarian-American soccer player and coach (b. 1904)
1975 – Lefty Frizzell, American singer-songwriter and guitarist (b. 1928)
1977 – Karl Ristikivi, Estonian geographer, author, and poet (b. 1912)
1980 – Margaret Craven, American journalist and author (b. 1901)
  1980   – Nihat Erim, Turkish jurist and politician, 13th Prime Minister of Turkey (b. 1912)
  1980   – Hans Morgenthau, German-American political scientist, philosopher, and academic (b. 1904)
1981 – Roger Doucet, Canadian tenor (b. 1919)
1982 – Hugh Everett III, American physicist and mathematician (b. 1930)
1984 – Faina Ranevskaya, Russian actress (b. 1896)
  1984   – Aziz Sami,  Iraqi writer and translator (b. 1895) 
1985 – Janusz Zajdel, Polish author (b. 1938)
1989 – Kazimierz Sabbat, Polish businessman and politician, President of the Republic of Poland (b. 1913)
1990 – Eddie Quillan, American actor (b. 1907)
1992 – Paolo Borsellino, Italian lawyer and judge (b. 1940)
1994 – Victor Barbeau, Canadian author and academic (b. 1896)
1998 – Elmer Valo, Polish-American baseball player, coach, and manager (b. 1921)
2002 – Dave Carter, American singer-songwriter and guitarist (b. 1952)
  2002   – Alan Lomax, American historian, scholar, and activist (b. 1915) 
2003 – Bill Bright, American evangelist and author, founded the Campus Crusade for Christ (b. 1921)
  2003   – Pierre Graber, Swiss politician, President of the Swiss National Council (b. 1908)
2004 – Sylvia Daoust, Canadian sculptor (b. 1902)
  2004   – J. Gordon Edwards, American entomologist, mountaineer, and DDT advocate (b. 1919)
  2004   – Francis A. Marzen, American priest and journalist (b. 1924)
  2004   – Zenkō Suzuki, Japanese politician, 70th Prime Minister of Japan (b. 1911)
2005 – Edward Bunker, American author and screenwriter (b. 1933)
2006 – Jack Warden, American actor (b. 1920)
2007 – A. K. Faezul Huq, Bangladeshi journalist, lawyer, and politician (b. 1945)
  2007   – Roberto Fontanarrosa, Argentinian cartoonist (b. 1944)
2008 – Dercy Gonçalves, Brazilian comedian and actress (b. 1907)
2009 – Frank McCourt, American author and educator (b. 1930)
  2009   – Henry Surtees, English race car driver (b. 1991)
2010 – Cécile Aubry, French actress, author, television screenwriter and director (b. 1928)
  2010   – Jon Cleary, Australian author and playwright (b. 1917)
2012 – Humayun Ahmed, Bangladeshi director and playwright (b. 1948)
  2012   – Tom Davis, American comedian, actor, and screenwriter (b. 1952) 
  2012   – Mohammad Hassan Ganji, Iranian meteorologist and academic (b. 1912)
  2012   – Omar Suleiman, Egyptian general and politician, 16th Vice President of Egypt (b. 1935) 
  2012   – Sylvia Woods, American businesswoman, co-founded Sylvia's Restaurant of Harlem (b. 1926) 
  2012   – Valiulla Yakupov, Islamic cleric (b. 1963)
2013 – Mikhail Gorsheniov, Russian singer-songwriter (b. 1973)
  2013   – Geeto Mongol, Canadian-American wrestler and trainer (b. 1931)
  2013   – Mel Smith, English actor, director, and screenwriter (b. 1952)
  2013   – Bert Trautmann, German footballer and manager (b. 1923)
  2013   – Phil Woosnam, Welsh-American soccer player and manager (b. 1932)
  2013   – Peter Ziegler, Swiss geologist and academic (b. 1928)
  2013   – Leyla Erbil, Turkish author (b. 1931)
2014 – Rubem Alves, Brazilian theologian (b. 1933)
  2014   – David Easton, Canadian-American political scientist and academic (b. 1917)
  2014   – Paul M. Fleiss, American pediatrician and author (b. 1933)
  2014   – James Garner, American actor (b. 1928)
  2014   – Jerzy Jurka, Polish biologist (b. 1950)
  2014   – Ray King, English footballer and manager (b. 1924)
  2014   – Ingemar Odlander, Swedish journalist (b. 1936)
  2014   – Harry Pougher, English cricketer (b. 1941)
  2014   – Leen Vleggeert, Dutch politician (b. 1931)
  2014   – John Winkin, American baseball player, coach, and journalist (b. 1919)
2015 – Van Alexander, American composer and conductor (b. 1915)
  2015   – Galina Prozumenshchikova, Ukrainian-Russian swimmer and journalist (b. 1948)
  2015   – Carmino Ravosa, American singer-songwriter, pianist, and producer (b. 1930)
  2015   – Gennadiy Seleznyov, Russian journalist and politician, 2nd Speaker of the Duma (b. 1947)
2016 – Garry Marshall, American actor, director, and producer (b. 1934)
2018 – Jon Schnepp, American producer, director, voice actor, editor, writer, cartoonist, animator, and cinematographer (b. 1967)
  2018   – Denis Ten, Kazakhstani figure skater (b. 1993)
2019 – Rutger Hauer, Dutch actor, director, and producer (b. 1944)

Holidays and observances
 Palace Day
 Christian feast day:
 Arsenius (Catholic Church)
 Bernold, Bishop of Utrecht
 Justa and Rufina
 Kirdjun (or Abakerazum)
 Macrina the Younger, Sister of St. Basil the Great
 Symmachus
 July 19 (Eastern Orthodox liturgics)
 Martyrs' Day (Myanmar) 
 Sandinista Day or Liberation Day (Nicaragua)

References

External links

 
 
 

Days of the year
July